Riding the Sunset Trail is a 1941 American Western film directed by Robert Emmett Tansey and written by Robert Emmett Tansey and Frances Kavanaugh. The film stars Tom Keene, Betty Miles, Frank Yaconelli, Sugar Dawn, Slim Andrews and Kenne Duncan. The film was released on October 31, 1941, by Monogram Pictures.

Plot

Cast          
Tom Keene as Tom Sterling
Betty Miles as Betty Dawson
Frank Yaconelli as Lopez Mendoza
Sugar Dawn as Sugar Dawson
Slim Andrews as Jasper Raines
Kenne Duncan as Jay Lynch 
Fred Hoose as Judge Little
Gene Alsace as Pecos Dean
Tom Seidel as Bronco West
Earl Douglas as Drifter Smith 
Tom London as Sheriff Hays
James Sheridan as Rip Carson
Jimmy Aubrey as Jim Dawson

References

External links
 

1941 films
1940s English-language films
American Western (genre) films
1941 Western (genre) films
Monogram Pictures films
Films directed by Robert Emmett Tansey
American black-and-white films
1940s American films